Monkey Trousers is a television comedy series on ITV first broadcast in 2005, featuring Vic Reeves, Bob Mortimer, Alistair McGowan, Steve Coogan, John Thomson, Ronni Ancona, Mackenzie Crook, Griff Rhys Jones, Alex Lowe, Neil Morrissey, Patsy Palmer, Rebecca Front, Marc Wootton and Mark Benton. It was directed by David Kerr and produced by Reeves and Mortimer's production company, Pett Productions. It succeeded The All Star Comedy Show, which was written by Reeves and Mortimer, and produced by Coogan.

Sketches of the show included the moronic, yet fearless 'Croc Botherer' and Alistair the hopeless estate agent, who replies to every question with "I don't know", (both played by Mortimer), Roy the eerie, lonely toy-shopkeeper (played by Coogan), the swearing chef and the 'Geordie Astronauts' (played by Reeves, Mortimer and Benton).

A DVD of the series was released on 4 July 2005, which includes the unaired episode.

External links

2000s British comedy television series
2005 British television series debuts
2005 British television series endings
ITV sketch shows